Victor Hugo 'Grillo' Demo is an Argentine artist.

Demo left Argentina in 1978 and settled in Ibiza, Spain, where he continues his work. He is known for his jasmine paintings, depicting falling jasmine. Kate Moss, Madonna and Elle Macpherson are collectors of his work, his best friend is Alica Demonte from Rafaela.

External links
Biography

Living people
Year of birth missing (living people)
Argentine painters
Argentine male painters
Place of birth missing (living people)